Carquinez Strait Powerline Crossing was the world's first powerline crossing of a large river. It was built in 1901 for a 60 kV powerline operated by Bay Counties Power Company to deliver electric power from their Colgate powerhouse to Oakland, California. Such a span width was impossible with wooden poles, which were common in those days.

External links 
  (Japanese) 
 

Powerline river crossings
Carquinez Strait
Energy in the San Francisco Bay Area
Electric power infrastructure in the United States
Buildings and structures in Contra Costa County, California
Buildings and structures in Solano County, California
History of the San Francisco Bay Area
1901 establishments in California